Oleg Anatolievich Dovgopol (born 14 October 1975) is a Transnistrian politician serving as the mayor of Tiraspol and Dnestrovsc since 23 December 2016.

Biography 
Dovgopol was born on 14 October 1975 in Bershad, Ukrainian SSR, USSR and moved to Tiraspol with his family in 1979. He graduated from the Faculty of Law of the Shevchenko Transnistria State University.

Since 1997 he served in the state security bodies of the Pridnestrovian Moldavian Republic. In 2005, he was elected a deputy of the Tiraspol City Council of People's Deputies. From 2006 to 2016 he worked as director of Centr-Market OOO.

Since 23 December 2016 he has been serving as the mayor of Tiraspol and Dnestrovsc.

References 

1975 births
Living people
People from Bershad
Transnistrian people of Ukrainian descent
Transnistrian politicians